Saber Mohamed Hasan (born 9 July 1967) is a Bahraini former cyclist. He competed in two events at the 1992 Summer Olympics.

References

1967 births
Living people
Bahraini male cyclists
Olympic cyclists of Bahrain
Cyclists at the 1992 Summer Olympics
Place of birth missing (living people)